Screaming Mimi may refer to:

Military
A nickname for the Nebelwerfer, a piece of German World War II rocket artillery
A nickname for the United States Air Force Cessna T-37 Tweet

Other uses
The Screaming Mimi (novel), a 1949 mystery novel by Fredric Brown
Screaming Mimi (film), a 1958 film adaptation of Brown's novel
Pink Sikorsky S-58DT, a helicopter in the 1980s TV show Riptide
Songbird (comics), a Marvel Comics character, formerly known as Screaming Mimi
The 1983 film National Lampoon's Vacation depicts the Griswalds and their hostages riding a roller coaster called The Screaming Mimi while at Wally World. The actual coaster shown in the film is Twisted Colossus at Six Flags Magic Mountain.
Famous vintage clothing store in New York City.

See also
Screaming Meemees, a New Zealand band that formed in the 1980s